Merlin: The Return is a 2000 British fantasy film written, produced, and directed by Paul Matthews. The film stars Rik Mayall, Patrick Bergin, Craig Sheffer, Adrian Paul, Julie Hartley, and Tia Carrere. It tells the story of Merlin and King Arthur in modern times.

Plot

For 1500 years, the powers of Merlin (Rik Mayella) have kept the evil Mordred (Craig Sheffer) and his mother Morgana (Gretchen Fox) captive in another world. When a present-day scientist (Tia Carrere) stumbles upon the gateway between this world and the one Mordred is imprisoned in, it is up to a recently re-awakened King Arthur (Patrick Bergin) Merlin and Lancelot (Adrian Paul) to stop Mordred from returning.

Cast
 Rik Mayall as Merlin
 Patrick Bergin as King Arthur
 Craig Sheffer as Mordred
 Adrian Paul as Lancelot
 Julie Hartley as Guinevere
 Tia Carrere as Dr. Joan Maxwell
 Leigh Greenstein as Kate
 Byron Taylor as Richie Gould
 Grete Fox as Morgana
 Jennifer Steyn as Richie's Mom
 Anthony Bishop as Gawain
 Lynne White as Aunt Verlyn
 Jocelyn Broderick as Megan

Reception
Critical reception for the film was mostly negative; Michael Thomson of the BBC wrote, "It's almost as if director Paul Matthews had accepted a bet to make the worst possible film." Time Out London commented that the film was "indifferently directed" but  was "a harmless adventure". Total Film, in summing up the film, wrote, "It's a word that has some might/It starts with `Sh'/And rhymes with kite...".

References

External links
 
 

2000 films
2000 fantasy films
Arthurian films
British fantasy films
Films set in South Africa
Works based on Merlin
2000s English-language films
Films directed by Paul Matthews
2000s British films